The Wairoa River of the Hawke's Bay region in New Zealand runs south for 65 kilometres from the inland east coast region of the North Island, west of Gisborne, before flowing into northern Hawke Bay at the town of Wairoa.

The full Māori name of the river is Te Wairoa Hōpūpū Hōnengenenge Mātangi Rau, which means the long, bubbling, swirling, uneven waters.

The major tributaries are:
 the Hangaroa River
 the Ruakituri River
 the Mangapoike River
 the Mangaaruhe River
 the Waiau River
 the Waikaretaheke River
The Hangaroa River and the Ruakituri River merge at Te Reinga Falls, near Te Reinga. This is where the Wairoa River begins.

Lake Waikaremoana is formed in the rockfall-dammed headwaters of the Waikaretaheke River. It has a confluence with the Waiau River 14 miles from the coast.

This flood flow is one of the largest recorded for any river in New Zealand.

In 2010, the Wairoa Township River Walkway project commenced. The Walkway is a pedestrian and cycle path starting at the bridge on the south bank of the Wairoa River. It is planned that it will eventually completely encircle the town.

Footnotes

External links 
 Wairoa District Council – Wairoa Township River Walkway

Rivers of the Hawke's Bay Region
Rivers of New Zealand